Shamil Tabra is a former Iraqi football forward who played for Iraq between 1962 and 1964. He played 3 matches and scored 1 goal against Lebanon in the 1964 Arab Nations Cup.

Career statistics

International goals
Scores and results list Iraq's goal tally first.

References

Iraqi footballers
Iraq international footballers
Al-Shorta SC players
Living people
Association football forwards
Year of birth missing (living people)